Kiliann Eric Sildillia (born 16 May 2002) is a French professional footballer who plays as a defender for Bundesliga club SC Freiburg.

Club career
Sildillia is a youth academy graduate of Metz. On 26 June 2020, Bundesliga club SC Freiburg announced the signing of Sildillia on a three-year deal. He made his professional debut for club's reserve team on 13 August 2021 in a 5–2 league defeat against Borussia Dortmund II.

International career
Sildillia is a former French youth international.

Personal life
Born in France, Sildillia is of Guadeloupean descent.

Career statistics

Honours
SC Freiburg II
 Regionalliga Südwest: 2020–21

References

External links
 
 

2002 births
Living people
French people of Guadeloupean descent
Sportspeople from Moselle (department)
Association football defenders
French footballers
France youth international footballers
Championnat National 3 players
3. Liga players
Regionalliga players
Bundesliga players
SC Freiburg II players
SC Freiburg players
French expatriate footballers
French expatriate sportspeople in Germany
Expatriate footballers in Germany
Footballers from Grand Est